was a town located in Abashiri District, Abashiri Subprefecture (now Okhotsk Subprefecture), Hokkaido, Japan.

As of 2004, the town had an estimated population of 5,925 and a population density of 37.26 persons per km². The total area was 159.02 km².

On March 31, 2006, Memanbetsu was merged with the village of Higashimokoto (also from Abashiri District) to create the new town of Ōzora.

Memanbetsu's name was derived from the Ainu "Memanpet" meaning "River with a spring"

Transportation
In the area of the former town, Hokkaido Railway Company (JR Hokkaido) operates two stations along the Sekihoku Line:
Memambetsu Station
Nishi-Memambetsu Station
Both are named after the former town.

Memanbetsu Airport is named after the former town.

History
1890 – Establishment of timber harvesting for the purpose of supplying the match manufacturing industry
1898 – Agriculture begins, bringing the first extensive settlement of the area
1912 – With the opening of Memambetsu station on the new railway line between Kitami and Abashiri large numbers of settlers begin arriving and a small village begins to develop
April 1921 – Memanbetsu is administratively separated from Abashiri City and accorded official village status
April 1951 – Memanbetsu is accorded official town status
31 March 2006 – Memanbetsu Town is merged with Higashimokoto Village (also in Abashiri District) to form the new town of Ōzora

Climate

References

External links

 Internet Archive of Memanbetsu's website 

Dissolved municipalities of Hokkaido